Carrie Staley is a former women's footballer. Staley's greatest achievement was scoring the winning goal in the 1977 FA Women's Cup Final.

Honours
QPR
 FA Women's Cup: 1977

References

Living people
English women's footballers
Women's association football forwards
Year of birth missing (living people)